The siege of Cherbourg  took place in 1450 during the Hundred Years' War when French forces laid siege to Cherbourg in the English-controlled Duchy of Normandy following their decisive victory at the Battle of Formigny. With the fall of Cherbourg, English control of Normandy was removed.

References
Nicolle, David. The Fall of English France 1449–53. Bloomsbury Publishing, 2012. 

Sieges of the Hundred Years' War
1450 in England
1450s in France
Conflicts in 1450
History of Cherbourg-en-Cotentin
Hundred Years' War, 1415–1453